Metarranthis duaria, the ruddy metarranthis, is a species of geometrid moth in the family Geometridae. It is found in North America.

The MONA or Hodges number for Metarranthis duaria is 6822.

References

Further reading

External links

 

Ennominae
Articles created by Qbugbot
Moths described in 1858